There are fifty-six mammal species in Latvia, of which one is endangered, four are vulnerable, and three are near threatened.

The following tags are used to highlight each species' conservation status as assessed by the International Union for Conservation of Nature:

Some species were assessed using an earlier set of criteria. Species assessed using this system have the following instead of near threatened and least concern categories:

Order: Rodentia (rodents) 

Rodents make up the largest order of mammals, with over 40% of mammalian species. They have two incisors in the upper and lower jaw which grow continually and must be kept short by gnawing. Three species of rodents (voles) have been discovered only in recent three decades: European pine vole, East European vole, and Tundra vole.

Suborder: Sciurognathi
Family: Castoridae (beavers)
Genus: Castor
 Eurasian beaver, C. fiber 
Family: Sciuridae (squirrels)
Subfamily: Sciurinae
Tribe: Pteromyini
Genus: Pteromys
 Siberian flying squirrel, P. volans 
Family: Gliridae (dormice)
Subfamily: Leithiinae
Genus: Dryomys
 Forest dormouse, Dryomys nitedula LR/nt
Genus: Eliomys
 Garden dormouse, Eliomys quercinus VU
Genus: Muscardinus
 Hazel dormouse, Muscardinus avellanarius LR/nt
Subfamily: Glirinae
Genus: Glis
 European edible dormouse, Glis glis LR/nt
Family: Dipodidae (jerboas)
Subfamily: Sicistinae
Genus: Sicista
 Northern birch mouse, Sicista betulina LR/nt
Family: Cricetidae
Subfamily: Arvicolinae
Genus: Arvicola
 Water vole, Arvicola terrestris LR/lc
Genus: Clethrionomys
 Bank vole, Clethrionomys glareolus LR/lc
Genus: Microtus
 European pine vole, Microtus subterraneus LR
 Field vole, Microtus agrestis LR/lc
 Common vole, Microtus arvalis LR/lc
 East European vole, Microtus mystacinus LR
 Tundra vole, Microtus oeconomus LR
Family: Muridae (mice, rats, voles, gerbils, hamsters, etc.)
Subfamily: Murinae
Genus: Apodemus
 Striped field mouse, Apodemus agrarius LR/lc
 Yellow-necked mouse, Apodemus flavicollis LR/lc
 Wood mouse, Apodemus sylvaticus LC
 Ural field mouse, Apodemus uralensis LR/lc
Genus: Micromys
 Harvest mouse, Micromys minutus LR/nt

Order: Lagomorpha (lagomorphs) 

The lagomorphs comprise two families, Leporidae (hares and rabbits), and Ochotonidae (pikas). Though they can resemble rodents, and were classified as a superfamily in that order until the early twentieth century, they have since been considered a separate order. They differ from rodents in a number of physical characteristics, such as having four incisors in the upper jaw rather than two.
Family: Leporidae (rabbits, hares)
Genus: Lepus
European hare, L. europaeus 
Mountain hare, L. timidus

Order: Erinaceomorpha (hedgehogs and gymnures) 

The order Erinaceomorpha contains a single family, Erinaceidae, which comprise the hedgehogs and gymnures. The hedgehogs are easily recognised by their spines while gymnures look more like large rats.

Family: Erinaceidae (hedgehogs)
Subfamily: Erinaceinae
Genus: Erinaceus
 Southern white-breasted hedgehog, E. concolor LC
 West European hedgehog, E. europaeus LC

Order: Soricomorpha (shrews, moles, and solenodons) 

The "shrew-forms" are insectivorous mammals. The shrews and solenodons closely resemble mice while the moles are stout-bodied burrowers.

Family: Soricidae (shrews)
Subfamily: Soricinae
Tribe: Nectogalini
Genus: Neomys
 Eurasian water shrew, Neomys fodiens LR/lc
Tribe: Soricini
Genus: Sorex
 Common shrew, Sorex araneus LR/lc
 Laxmann's shrew, Sorex caecutiens LR/lc
 Eurasian pygmy shrew, Sorex minutus LR/lc
Family: Talpidae (moles)
Subfamily: Talpinae
Tribe: Talpini
Genus: Talpa
 European mole, Talpa europaea LR/lc

Order: Chiroptera (bats) 

The bats' most distinguishing feature is that their forelimbs are developed as wings, making them the only mammals capable of flight. Bat species account for about 20% of all mammals.
Family: Vespertilionidae
Subfamily: Myotinae
Genus: Myotis
 Brandt's bat, Myotis brandti LR/lc
 Pond bat, Myotis dasycneme VU
 Daubenton's bat, Myotis daubentonii LR/lc
 Whiskered bat, Myotis mystacinus LR/lc
 Natterer's bat, Myotis nattereri LR/lc
Subfamily: Vespertilioninae
Genus: Barbastella
Western barbastelle, B. barbastellus 
Genus: Eptesicus
 Northern bat, Eptesicus nilssoni LR/lc
Genus: Nyctalus
 Lesser noctule, Nyctalus leisleri LR/nt
 Common noctule, Nyctalus noctula LR/lc
Genus: Pipistrellus
 Nathusius' pipistrelle, Pipistrellus nathusii LR/lc
 Common pipistrelle, Pipistrellus pipistrellus LC
Genus: Plecotus
Brown long-eared bat, P. auritus 
Genus: Vespertilio
 Parti-coloured bat, Vespertilio murinus LR/lc

Order: Cetacea (whales) 

The order Cetacea includes whales, dolphins and porpoises. They are the mammals most fully adapted to aquatic life with a spindle-shaped nearly hairless body, protected by a thick layer of blubber, and forelimbs and tail modified to provide propulsion underwater.

Suborder: Mysticeti
Family: Balaenidae (right whales)
Genus: Balaena
 North Atlantic right whale, Eubalaena glacialis CR or functionally extinct in the eastern Atlantic
Family: Balaenopteridae
Subfamily: Balaenopterinae
Genus: Balaenoptera
 Fin whale, Balaenoptera physalus EN
 Common minke whale, Balaenoptera acutorostrata LC
Subfamily: Megapterinae
Genus: Megaptera
 Humpback whale, Megaptera novaeangliae LC
Suborder: Odontoceti
Family: Phocoenidae
Genus: Phocoena
 Harbour porpoise, Phocoena phocoena VU
Family: Monodontidae
Genus: Delphinapterus
 Beluga, Delphinapterus leucas VU
Family: Ziphidae
Genus: Mesoplodon
 Sowerby's beaked whale, Mesoplodon bidens DD
Family: Delphinidae (marine dolphins)
Genus: Lagenorhynchus
 White-beaked dolphin, Lagenorhynchus albirostris LR/lc
Genus: Tursiops
 Bottlenose dolphin, Tursiops truncatus DD
Genus: Orcinus
 Orca, Orcinus orca DD

Order: Carnivora (carnivorans) 

There are over 260 species of carnivorans, the majority of which feed primarily on meat. They have a characteristic skull shape and dentition.
Suborder: Feliformia
Family: Felidae (cats)
Subfamily: Felinae
Genus: Lynx
 Eurasian lynx, L. lynx LC
Suborder: Caniformia
Family: Canidae (dogs, foxes)
Genus: Canis
 Grey wolf, Canis lupus LC
Genus: Vulpes
 Red fox, Vulpes vulpes LC
Family: Ursidae (bears)
Genus: Ursus
 Brown bear, U. arctos LC
Family: Mustelidae (mustelids)
Genus: Lutra
 European otter, L. lutra NT
Genus: Martes
European pine marten, M. martes LC
Genus: Meles
 European badger, M. meles LC
Genus: Mustela
 Stoat, M. erminea LC
 European mink, M. lutreola CR extirpated
 Least weasel, M. nivalis LC
 European polecat, M. putorius LC
Genus: Neogale
American mink, N. vison  introduced
Family: Phocidae (earless seals)
Genus: Halichoerus
 Grey seal, Halichoerus grypus LC
Genus: Pusa
 Ringed seal, Pusa hispida LC

Order: Artiodactyla (even-toed ungulates) 

The even-toed ungulates are ungulates whose weight is borne about equally by the third and fourth toes, rather than mostly or entirely by the third as in perissodactyls. There are about 220 artiodactyl species, including many that are of great economic importance to humans.
Family: Bovidae
Subfamily: Bovinae
Genus: Bison
European bison, B. bonasus  reintroduced
Family: Cervidae (deer)
Subfamily: Cervinae
Genus: Cervus
Red deer, C. elaphus 
Genus: Dama
 European fallow deer, D. dama  introduced
Subfamily: Capreolinae
Genus: Alces
Moose, A. alces 
Genus: Capreolus
Roe deer, C. capreolus 
Family: Suidae (pigs)
Subfamily: Suinae
Genus: Sus
Wild boar, S. scrofa

See also
List of chordate orders
Lists of mammals by region
List of prehistoric mammals
Mammal classification
List of mammals described in the 2000s

Notes

References
 

Latvia
Mammals
Mammals
Latvia